National Highway 244 (NH 244) is a  National Highway in India. It is located entirely within the union territory of Jammu and Kashmir. It was originally called National Highway 1B.

Route 
NH 244 starts at NH44 near Khanabal, Achabal, Kokernag, Daksum, Sinthan pass (Elevation: 3748 m), Kishtwar via Thathri, [[Doda,, kheleni Goha Marmat sudhmadev chineni  Jammu and Kashmir.

See also
 List of National Highways in India (by Highway Number)

References

External links
 NH244 mapped on OpenStreetMap

National highways in India